Abbott is an unincorporated community in Upshur County, West Virginia, United States.

History
A post office was established at Abbott in 1901, and remained in operation until 1942. The postmaster, Charles A. Abbott, gave the community his name.

References 

Unincorporated communities in West Virginia
Unincorporated communities in Upshur County, West Virginia